The 2011 Mountain West Conference football season was the 13th season of college football for the Mountain West Conference (MW). Eight teams participated in that season: Air Force, Colorado State, New Mexico, San Diego State, TCU, UNLV, Wyoming and new member Boise State.

This was the first year the MW was without founding members Utah and BYU, which respectively left for the Pac-12 Conference and FBS independent status, with BYU's other sports joining the West Coast Conference. In response to their departure, the conference added Boise State for this season, and would eventually add  Fresno State, Hawaii (football only; other sports joined the Big West Conference), and Nevada for the 2012 season.

This was also the last year for TCU as an MW member. The Horned Frogs were originally set to become a member of the Big East Conference in the 2012 season. However, on October 10, they accepted a bid to join the Big 12 Conference.

Previous season
TCU repeated as conference champions going undefeated (12–0) during the regular season for the second consecutive year. They finished the year as the highest ranked non-automatic qualifying school in the BCS rankings to receive an automatic bid to a BCS game. Since Oregon was ranked in the top two and selected to play in the BCS National Championship Game, the Rose Bowl was contractually obligated to take the highest ranked non-AQ to fill the Pac-10's spot. The Horned Frogs defeated Wisconsin in the Rose Bowl 21–19 to finish the season 13–0 and finished ranked #2 in both the AP and Coaches Polls.

Air Force, BYU, San Diego State, and Utah also went to bowl games. Everyone but Utah won their bowl game to give the conference a 4–1 bowl record to win the Bowl Challenge Cup for the second consecutive year.

At one point during the season, both TCU and Utah were both ranked in the top 5 of the BCS rankings.

Preseason

Award watch lists
The following Mountain West players were named to preseason award watch lists.

Maxwell Award:
 Doug Martin – Boise State
 Kellen Moore – Boise State
 Ronnie Hillman – San Diego State
 Ryan Lindley – San Diego State

Chuck Bednarik Award:
 Billy Winn – Boise State
 Tanner Brock – TCU
 Tank Carder – TCU

John Mackey Award:
 Kyle Efaw – Boise State
 Lucas Reed – New Mexico

Fred Biletnikoff Award:
 Tyler Shoemaker – Boise State
 Josh Boyce – TCU

Bronko Nagurski Trophy:
 Billy Winn – Boise State
 Mychal Sisson – Colorado State
 Miles Burris – San Diego State
 Tanner Brock – TCU
 Tank Carder – TCU

Outland Trophy:
 Nate Potter – Boise State
 Billy Winn – Boise State

Jim Thorpe Award:
 George Iloka – Boise State

Lombardi Award:
 Thomas Byrd – Boise State
 Shea McClellin – Boise State
 Nate Potter – Boise State
 Billy Winn – Boise State
 Mychall Sisson – Colorado State
 Carmen Messina – New Mexico
 Miles Burris – San Diego State
 Tanner Brock – TCU
 Tank Carder – TCU

Rimington Trophy:
 Thomas Byrd – Boise State
 Weston Richburg – Colorado State
 Dillon Farrell – New Mexico
 Nick Carlson – Wyoming

Davey O'Brien Award:
 Kellen Moore – Boise State
 Ryan Lindley – San Diego State

Doak Walker Award:
 Asher Clark – Air Force
 Doug Martin – Boise State
 Ronnie Hillman – San Diego State
 Matthew Tucker – TCU
 Ed Wesley – TCU
 Alvester Alexander – Wyoming

Walter Camp Award:
 Kellen Moore – Kellen Moore
 Ronnie Hillman – San Diego State
 Tank Carder – TCU

Lott Trophy:
 Billy Winn – Boise State
 Tank Carder – TCU

Lou Groza Award:
 Able Perez – San Diego State
 Ross Evans – TCU

Mountain West media days

Media poll
During the Mountain West media days on July 26–27 in Las Vegas, Boise State was picked as the overwhelming favorite to win the conference, garnering 28 of a possible 31 first place votes. Defending champion TCU received the other 3 first place votes and were picked second.

 Boise State – 236 (28)
 TCU – 208 (3)
 Air Force – 176
 San Diego State – 160
 Colorado State – 104
 Wyoming – 80
 UNLV – 77
 New Mexico – 39

All–Conference Team
The media also selected their preseason all–conference team. Boise State's Sr. QB Kellen Moore was selected as the offensive player of the year. TCU's Sr. LB Tank Carder was selected as the defensive player of the year. Air Force's Sr. KR Jonathan Warzeka was selected as the special teams player of the year.

Offense
QB Kellen Moore–Boise State
RB Doug Martin–Boise State
RB Ronnie Hillman–San Diego State
WR Phillip Payne–UNLV
WR Josh Boyce–TCU
TE Lucas Reed–New Mexico
OL Thomas Byrd–Boise State
OL Nate Potter–Boise State
OL A.J. Wallerstein–Air Force
OL Kyle Dooley–TCU
OL Paul Madsen–Colorado State

Defense
DL Billy Winn–Boise State
DL Shea McClellin–Boise State
DL Stansly Maponga–TCU
DL Josh Biezuns–Wyoming
LB Tank Carder–TCU
LB Mychal Sisson–Colorado State
LB Miles Burris–San Diego State
DB George Iloka–Boise State
DB Leon McFadden–San Diego State
DB Anthony Wright–Air Force
DB Jon Davis–Air Force

Specialists
PK James Aho–New Mexico
P Brian Stahovich–San Diego State
KR Jonathan Warzeka–Air Force

Boise State all blue uniform ban
New conference member Boise State was banned by the Mountain West Conference from wearing their traditional all blue uniforms during conference home games. Mountain West commissioner Craig Thompson's reason for the rule was that coaches had stated that the Broncos received a "competitive advantage" when wearing all blue on the blue turf of Bronco Stadium. Boise State head coach Chris Petersen was quoted that he thought the ban was, "ridiculous".

Coaches
NOTE: Stats shown are before the beginning of the season

*first year as conference member, ^achieved as head coach of New Mexico from 99–08

Rankings
The following Mountain West teams have been either ranked or received votes in the major polls during the 2011 season:

Mountain West vs. BCS matchups

Regular season

All dates, times, and TV are tentative and subject to change.

The Mountain West has teams in 3 different time zones. Times reflect start time in respective time zone of each team (Central–TCU, Mountain–Air Force, Boise State, Colorado State, New Mexico, Wyoming, Pacific–San Diego State, UNLV). Conference games start times are that of the home team.

Rankings reflect that of the USA Today Coaches poll for that week until week eight when the BCS poll will be used.

Week one

^ Neutral site

Players of the week:

Week two

Players of the week:

Week three

^ Neutral site
Players of the week:

Kellen Moore was also named the Davy O'Brien Quarterback of the Week. Greg McCoy was also named the National Kickoff Returner of the Week by College Football Performance Awards.

Week four

Players of the week:

Coaching change

On September 25, 2011 following a 0–4 start which included a loss to Sam Houston State of the FCS, New Mexico relieved Mike Locksley of his duties as head coach. Associate head coach and defensive coordinator George Barlow assumed the job on an interim basis for the remainder of the season.

Week five

Players of the week:

Week six

Players of the week:

Week seven

Players of the week:

Week eight

Players of the week:

Week nine

^ Neutral site

Players of the week:

Week ten

Players of the week:

Week eleven

Players of the week:

Week twelve

Week thirteen

Week fourteen

Home attendance

References